Loanshark is a 1999 black-and-white American crime film written and directed by Jay Jennings. The film is a notable forerunner in the digital filmmaking movement.

Plot
An angry loan shark has a tendency of getting excessively violent with anyone who doesn't have his money. His mob boss disapproves of his actions, warning him to tone things down or else. As expected, things only get worse.

Production
Produced for $10,000, Loanshark was made using handheld digital movie cameras and available light, with film look added in post-production. The low-budget film was shot guerrilla filmmaking style among old Hollywood buildings and streets.

Reception
Loanshark screened at several film festivals in 2000, including Silver Lake and Melbourne Underground Film Festival. Films In Review columnist David Del Valle called Loanshark "a gritty crime tale in the manner of Bad Lieutenant ".

References

External links

1999 films
1999 crime drama films
American independent films
Films set in Los Angeles
American black-and-white films
Money lenders
1999 directorial debut films
American crime drama films
1999 independent films
1990s English-language films
1990s American films